Hank Williams Jr.'s Greatest Hits, Vol. 3 is a compilation album by American musician Hank Williams Jr. released by Warner Bros. Records in February 1989. The album includes eleven tracks, eight of which were Number One and Top 10 singles on the Billboard Hot Country Singles & Tracks chart released on the studio albums Five-O, Montana Cafe and Born to Boogie. The song "My Name Is Bocephus" was originally a track recorded for Montana Cafe, but Williams later recorded a live version of the song and included it on the live album, Hank Live. The live version was the one used for the compilation. The album included two original singles, "There's a Tear in My Beer" and "Finders Are Keepers", that peaked at number 7 and number 6 respectively on the Billboard Hot Country Singles & Tracks chart.

Critical and commercial success
As with Greatest Hits, Vol. 1 and Greatest Hits, Vol. 2, this compilation proved to be both a commercial and critical success for Williams. It reached Number One on the Billboard Top Country Albums chart, giving Williams his ninth Number One career album. It is also Williams eighth career album to be certified at least Platinum by the RIAA. "There's a Tear in My Beer" in particular enjoyed great success. Using sophisticated editing technology, a music video was created in which it appeared as though Williams was singing with his father, Hank Williams, Sr., who died on January 1, 1953. Williams won his only Grammy Award for this performance, winning for Best Country Vocal Collaboration, an award that's also officially recognized as being shared by his late father. The video for the song won both the Country Music Association Music Video of the Year and Academy of Country Music Video of the Year awards. It also received nominations for ACM Single Record of the Year and ACM Song of the Year.

Track listing
All songs written by Hank Williams Jr. except where noted.
"I'm for Love" – 2:52
"This Ain't Dallas" – 2:43
"Ain't Misbehavin'" (Fats Waller, Andy Razaf, Harry Brooks) – 4:34
"Country State of Mind" (Hank Williams Jr., Roger Alan Wade) – 3:40
"Mind Your Own Business" (Hank Williams) – 2:28
collaboration with Reba McEntire, Tom Petty, Reverend Ike & Willie Nelson
"My Name Is Bocephus" – 3:46
live recording
"Born to Boogie" – 2:42
"Young Country" – 3:29
"Heaven Can't Be Found" – 3:11
"Finders Are Keepers" – 3:41
"There's a Tear in My Beer" (Hank Williams) – 2:53
duet with Hank Williams

Charts

Weekly charts

Year-end charts

References

1989 greatest hits albums
Hank Williams Jr. compilation albums
Warner Records compilation albums